Norman Walker (8 October 1892 – 4 November 1963) was an English film director. In the 1940s he set up his own company G.H.W. Productions, backed by the Rank Organisation, and released four films.

Filmography
 Tommy Atkins (1928)
 Widecombe Fair (1928)
 The Hate Ship (1929)
 A Romance of Seville (1929)
 Loose Ends (1930)
 The Middle Watch (1930)
 Uneasy Virtue (1931)
 The Shadow Between (1931)
 Fires of Fate (1932)
 Mr. Bill the Conqueror (1932)
 Forging Ahead (1933)
 The House of Trent (1933)
 The Fortunate Fool (1933)
 The Flaw (1933)
 The Way of Youth (1934)
 Dangerous Ground (1934)
 Lilies of the Field (1934)
 Turn of the Tide (1935)
 Key to Harmony (1935)
 Debt of Honour (1936)
 Sunset in Vienna (1937)
 Our Fighting Navy (1937)
 The Man at the Gate (1941)
 The Great Mr. Handel (1942)
 Hard Steel (1942)
 They Knew Mr. Knight (1946)
 John Wesley (1954)

References

External links
 

1892 births
1963 deaths
English film directors
People from Bolton